The 1961 Washington Huskies football team was an American football team that represented the University of Washington during the 1961 NCAA University Division football season.  In its fifth season under head coach Jim Owens, the team compiled a 5–4–1 record, finished in a tie for second place in the Athletic Association of Western Universities, and outscored its opponents by a combined total of 119 to 98. Kermit Jorgensen was the team captain.

Schedule

All-Coast

Professional football draft selections
Two University of Washington Huskies were selected in the 1962 NFL Draft, which lasted twenty rounds with 280 selections. One of those Huskies was also selected in the 1962 AFL Draft, which lasted thirty-four rounds with 272 selections.

References

Washington
Washington Huskies football seasons
Washington Huskies football